The black-throated grosbeak (Saltator fuliginosus) is a seed-eating passerine bird in the tanager family Thraupidae.

It is found in humid Atlantic Forest in far northeastern Argentina (Misiones), eastern and southeastern Brazil, and far eastern Paraguay. It is overall very dark grey, and the male has a black face, throat and chest. Adults of both genders have a red bill (can fade in captivity), but this is yellowish-dusky in juveniles. It closely resembles the slate-colored grosbeak, which has a white throat.

References

External links

Black-throated Grosbeak videos on the Internet Bird Collection
Black-throated Grosbeak photo gallery VIREO 

black-throated grosbeak
Birds of the Atlantic Forest
black-throated grosbeak
Taxonomy articles created by Polbot